David Bedella (born September 25, 1962) is an American actor. He is currently based in London and is best known for his Olivier award-winning roles in Jerry Springer: The Opera,  In The Heights and & Juliet.

Early life and career
Bedella was born in Gary, Indiana and graduated from Merrillville High School in 1980. After performing in Showboat ‘81 at Opryland U.S.A. he began eight years of theatre in Chicago from 1982–1990 during which, in 1985, he won his first professional acting award, the Joseph Jefferson Award (Actor in a Supporting Role in a Musical) for his performance in A Chorus Line.
After several National Tours including Dreamgirls, Jesus Christ Superstar and 42nd Street, he relocated to New York City in the autumn of 1990 and began what would be 11 years of regional and Broadway work which included Goodspeed Opera House in 1991 and a tour of La Cage aux Folles starring Gene Barry and Lee Roy Reams.

From 1992 to 1995, he played Caiaphas in the 20th anniversary national tour of Jesus Christ Superstar with Ted Neeley, Carl Anderson, Dennis DeYoung, Irene Cara and Syreeta Wright. 
In 1995, he joined the original company of Smokey Joe's Cafe on Broadway which he played, on and off, for five years before leaving to tour the United States with Diahann Carroll in Lerner and Loewe’s Almost Like Being in Love.

In 2001, he and his boyfriend at the time, Pressley Sutherland, relocated to the United Kingdom where Bedella began his London career.

Later career

In 2002, Bedella won his most famous role in Jerry Springer: The Opera at the National Theatre, where he played both Warm Up Man "Jonathan Wierus" (in the first act), named after the 15th-century occultist Johann Weyer, and Satan in the second act. For this role, Bedella received the 2004 Laurence Olivier Award for Best Actor in a Musical.

After that Bedella appeared in a recurring role as plastic surgeon Dr. Carlos Fashola in 2004 in the British hospital drama Holby City. He then went on to play the title role in Hedwig and the Angry Inch, and had a 16-month run playing Frank-N-Furter in the 2006–2007 UK tour of Richard O'Brien's The Rocky Horror Show. During that period he also had minor roles in a number of movies, including Batman Begins, Red Light Runners and Alexander.

In 2008, he played the role of Alexander Molokov in a concert version of Chess at the Royal Albert Hall on 12–13 May 2008, and performed in the West End gala performance of Elegies for Angels, Punks and Raging Queens at Soho Revue Bar.

Since 2009, Bedella has provided voices of some characters in the UK and US narrations of Thomas and Friends such as Carlos, Victor, the Mayor of Sodor, and a Cuban Man. In 2012, he replaced fellow cast member Matt Wilkinson as Victor in the UK narration in Blue Mountain Mystery, though Wilkinson remains a cast member of the CGI series. In 2015, he replaced fellow cast member Keith Wickham as the Mayor of Sodor in the UK narration starting with season 19, and like Wilkinson, Wickham still provides voices for the show.

In 2009–2010 he reprised his role as Frank-N-Furter in the UK tour cast of The Rocky Horror Show.

In October 2011, he appeared in a concert of the new musical Soho Cinders at the Queen's Theatre, London.

In 2012, he played Arnold in Harvey Fierstein's Torch Song Trilogy at the Menier Chocolate Factory in London.

Bedella made his pantomime debut as Blackheart, in Robinson Crusoe and the Caribbean Pirates at the New Theatre, Cardiff with Christopher Biggins, Paul Zerdin, Lucy Sinclair, Alexander Delemere, Stephanie Siadatan and Gary Jerry in the season of 2011–2012.

In 2013, he appeared in By Any Means, and in 2014, he starred as popstar Frankie Parsons in the Inside No. 9 episode "Last Gasp".

In 2014, he appeared with Bradley Walsh in Peter Pan at the Milton Keynes Theatre.

On 16 January 2015, it was confirmed that Bedella would be joining Mel Brooks' The Producers as Roger De Bris.

He reprised his role as Frank-N-Furter in The Rocky Horror Show in London with the show's writer Richard O'Brien.

For several years, Bedella has hosted his own live chat show, David Bedella And Friends (DBAF) which won the London Cabaret Society’s Best Long Running Cabaret Award in 2015. The chat show began at the Alley Cat and moved to the St. James Theatre in Victoria, London, hosting an array of artists from stage and screen.

From 2015–2017 Bedella starred in the role of Kevin Rosario in the Tony Award-winning In The Heights at the Kings Cross Theatre in London, for which he won the WhatsOnStage Award and his second Laurence Olivier Award for Best Actor in a Supporting Role in a Musical.

In 2017, he recorded two songs for the album Wit & Whimsy – Songs by Alexander S. Bermange (one solo and one featuring all of the album's 23 artists), which reached No. 1 in the iTunes comedy album chart.

In 2018, Bedella returned to Chicago as part of the cast of the U.S. premiere of Nell Gwynn at Chicago Shakespeare Theater.

In 2019, he originated the role of Lance in the original musical & Juliet, based on the story of Romeo & Juliet. The musical made its world debut at the Manchester Opera House and further transferred to London's Shaftesbury Theatre. Bedella subsequently won the 2020 Olivier Award for Best Supporting Actor In A Musical for his performance. This marked his second win in this category and third Olivier win overall. Bedella departed the production on 26 March 2022.

He has also partnered John Linehan (aka: May McFettridg) in pantomime at the Belfast Grand Opera House in Northern Ireland.

Filmography

Film

Television

Awards and nominations

References

External links
 BBC interview: David Bedella on Rocky Horror (March '07)
 
 London Theatre Guide interview with David Bedella
 BBCi interview: David Bedella on Holby City
 David Bedella wins best Musical Actor in the Laurence Olivier Awards
 

Living people
1962 births
American expatriate male actors in the United Kingdom
American male film actors
American male musical theatre actors
American male television actors
American male voice actors
Laurence Olivier Award winners
Male actors from Chicago
People from Merrillville, Indiana